Ali Asghar Asiabari is an Iranian karateka. He won the silver medal in the men's kumite 75 kg event at the 2017 World Games in Wrocław, Poland. He won the silver medal in the men's 75 kg event at the 2021 Islamic Solidarity Games held in Konya, Turkey.

Achievements

References

External links 
 

Living people
Year of birth missing (living people)
Place of birth missing (living people)
Iranian male karateka
Islamic Solidarity Games medalists in karate
Islamic Solidarity Games competitors for Iran
21st-century Iranian people